Hickok may refer to:

People
 Eugene W. Hickok (born 1951), American education advocate
 Laurens Perseus Hickok (1798–1888), American philosopher
 Lorena Hickok (1893–1968), American journalist
 Wild Bill Hickok (1837–1876), American scout and gunfighter
 William Hickok (1874-1933), American football player and industrialist
 Dewey K. Hickok, American inventor 
 Elizabeth Hickok Robbins Stone, American pioneer
 Kramer Hickok, American professional golfer

Other uses
 Hickok, Kansas, United States
 Hickok (film), a 2017 movie
 Hickok45, aka Greg Kinman, a YouTube channel featuring videos about firearms

See also
 Hickok Belt
 Hickox (disambiguation)
 Hitchcock (disambiguation)